Karen Elizabeth Marsden  (born 28 November 1962 in Perth) is a former Australian field hockey goalkeeper, who was a member of the Olympic gold medal winning team of the 1996 Summer Olympics.

Marsden was awarded the Medal of the Order of Australia (OAM) in the 1997 Australia Day Honours and the Australian Sports Medal in 2000.

References

External links
 
 Australian Olympic Committee

1962 births
Living people
Australian female field hockey players
Female field hockey goalkeepers
Olympic field hockey players of Australia
Field hockey players at the 1992 Summer Olympics
Field hockey players at the 1996 Summer Olympics
Field hockey players from Perth, Western Australia
Olympic gold medalists for Australia
Olympic medalists in field hockey
Medalists at the 1996 Summer Olympics
Recipients of the Medal of the Order of Australia
Recipients of the Australian Sports Medal
20th-century Australian women